Estola basinotata is a species of beetle in the family Cerambycidae. It was described by Henry Walter Bates in 1866. It is known from Brazil, French Guiana, and Ecuador.

References

Estola
Beetles described in 1866